The Lawrence L. Knoebel Covered Bridge is a historic wooden covered bridge located at Knoebels Amusement Resort connecting Cleveland Township in Columbia County, Pennsylvania and Ralpho Township in Northumberland County, Pennsylvania. It was moved to its present located between 1935 and 1937. It crosses South Branch Roaring Creek. It is one of 28 historic covered bridges in Columbia and Montour Counties.

It was listed on the National Register of Historic Places in 1979.

References 

Covered bridges on the National Register of Historic Places in Pennsylvania
Covered bridges in Columbia County, Pennsylvania
Covered bridges in Northumberland County, Pennsylvania
Bridges completed in 1875
Wooden bridges in Pennsylvania
Bridges in Columbia County, Pennsylvania
Bridges in Northumberland County, Pennsylvania
National Register of Historic Places in Northumberland County, Pennsylvania
National Register of Historic Places in Columbia County, Pennsylvania
Road bridges on the National Register of Historic Places in Pennsylvania
Queen post truss bridges in the United States